The 1955–56 season was Fussball Club Basel 1893's 62nd season in their existence. It was their tenth consecutive season in the top flight of Swiss football after their promotion from the Nationalliga B the season 1945–46. They played their home games in the Landhof, in the Wettstein Quarter in Kleinbasel. Jules Düblin was the club's chairman. It was his tenth successive season as chairman.

Overview 
During the previous four or five years the number of players joining and leaving the club was increasing considerably. The other Swiss clubs politics of buying new players was increasing strongly and transfer fees rose rapidly in this period. Basel, under the leadership of Jules Düblin, were trying to stay clear of this transfer trading. But because at the beginning of the previous season they had lost important players, such as goalkeeper Gianfranco de Taddeo to Cantonal Neuchatel, midfielder Kurt Maurer to La Chaux-de-Fonds and striker Walter Bielser to Biel-Bienne, the Basel board of directors were changing their approach to the subject. Düblin explained the situation at the AGM and the club members gave him the rights to strengthen the team. Béla Sárosi was hired as new team manager. Various transfers were made, Werner Schley returned from Grasshopper Club, Gottlieb Stäuble returned from Lausanne-Sport, Walter Bielser returned from Biel-Bienne, Silvan Thüler was hired from Solothurn and Peter-Jürgen Sanmann was hired from Concordia Hamburg. The exact amount that this all cost is not recorded, but the club needed to take up credits, one of which came from the city of Basel over the amount of 30,000 Swiss Francs.

As mentioned Béla Sárosi was hired in as new team manager. The Hungarian ex-international footballer had been team manager by Lugano the previous two seasons. He replaced René Bader who continued as player. There were fourteen teams contesting in the 1955–56 Nationalliga A, these were the top 12 teams from the previous season and the two newly promoted teams Urania Genève Sport and FC Schaffhausen. Again this season, the bottom two teams in the table were to be relegated. Basel won 10 of their 26 games and drew six times and lost 10 times. They scored 47 goals and conceded 50. Basel ended the championship with 26 points in 7th position. They were 16 points behind new champions Grasshopper Club. Grenchen and Fribourg suffered relegation. 

Josef Hügi was again Basel's top league goal scorer with 14 goals and he was joint seventh league top scorer behind Branislav Vukosavljević from Grasshopper Club who had scored 33 times. Gottlieb Stäuble was Basel's second best goal scorer with 13 goals and joint ninth league top scorer. Further, Peter-Jürgen Sanmann netted six times. Four goals in one match could be noted for Hügi on 10 June 1956 and also a hat-trick for Sanmann in the same game as Basel won 9–1 against Fribourg. This was seen by only 3,800 supporters, Basel's lowest home attendance that season.

Basel joined the Swiss Cup in the third principal round. They were drawn away against lower tier local team SC Binningen, but because they waived the home advantage the match was played at the Landhof and Basel won 5–0. Rolf Keller scored a hat-trick in this game. In the fourth round they were drawn at home to lower tier FC Emmenbrücke and Basel won 6–2. Josef Hügi scored a hat-trick in this game. In the fifth round Basel were drawn at home to Biel-Bienne. Gottlieb Stäuble scored a hat-trick and Basel won 7–3. In the quarter-finals basel were drawn away against Cantonal Neuchatel, but here they were knocked out of the competition.

Players 
The following is the list of the Basel first team squad during the season 1955–56. The list includes players that were in the squad on the day that the Nationalliga A season started on 28 August 1955 but subsequently left the club after that date.

 
 

 

 
 
 

Players who left the squad

Results 
Legend

Friendly matches

Pre-season and mid-season

Winter break to end of season

Nationalliga A

League matches

League table

Swiss Cup

See also
 History of FC Basel
 List of FC Basel players
 List of FC Basel seasons

References

Sources 
 Die ersten 125 Jahre. Publisher: Josef Zindel im Friedrich Reinhardt Verlag, Basel. 
 The FCB team 1955–56 at fcb-archiv.ch
 Switzerland 1955–56 by Erik Garin at Rec.Sport.Soccer Statistics Foundation

External links
 FC Basel official site

FC Basel seasons
Basel